A big lie is a gross distortion or misrepresentation of the truth, used especially as a propaganda technique. The German expression was coined by Adolf Hitler, when he dictated his book Mein Kampf (1925), to describe the use of a lie so colossal that no one would believe that someone "could have the impudence to distort the truth so infamously."

According to historian Jeffrey Herf, the Nazis used the idea of the original big lie to turn sentiment against Jews and justify the Holocaust. Herf maintains that Joseph Goebbels and the Nazi Party actually used the big lie technique that they describedand that they used it to turn long-standing antisemitism in Europe into mass murder. Herf further argues that the Nazis' big lie was their depiction of Germany as an innocent, besieged land striking back at "international Jewry", which the Nazis blamed for starting . Nazi propaganda repeatedly claimed that Jews held power behind the scenes in Britain, Russia, and the United States. It further spread claims that the Jews had begun a war of extermination against Germany, and used these to assert that Germany had a right to annihilate the Jews in self-defense.

In the 21st century, the term has been applied to attempts to overturn the result of the 2020 U.S. presidential election by Donald Trump and his allies, specifically the false claim that the election was stolen through massive voter and electoral fraud. The scale of the claims resulted in Trump supporters attacking the United States Capitol. Later reports indicate that Trump knew he had lost the election while promoting the narrative. Scholars say that constant repetition in many different media is necessary for the success of the big lie technique, as is a psychological motivation for the audience to believe the extreme assertions.

Use on behalf of Nazi Germany

Hitler's description 

The source of the big lie technique is this passage, taken from Chapter 10 of James Murphy's translation of Adolf Hitler's Mein Kampf. (The quote is one paragraph in Murphy's translation and in the German original.)

In 1943, The New York Times contributor Edwin James asserted that Hitler's biggest lie was his revisionist claim that Germany was not defeated in war in 1918, but rather was betrayed by internal groups. This stab-in-the-back myth was spread by right-wing groups, including the Nazis.

In enacting the Holocaust 
According to historian Jeffrey Herf, the Nazis used the idea of the original big lie to turn sentiment against Jews and justify the Holocaust. Herf maintains that Joseph Goebbels and the Nazi Party actually used the big lie technique that they describedand that they used it to turn long-standing antisemitism in Europe into mass murder. Herf further argues that the Nazis' big lie was their depiction of Germany as an innocent, besieged land striking back at international Jewry, which the Nazis blamed for starting . Nazi propaganda repeatedly claimed that Jews held power behind the scenes in Britain, Russia, and the United States. It further spread claims that the Jews had begun a war of extermination against Germany, and used these to assert that Germany had a right to annihilate the Jews in self-defense.

The Cold War historian Zachary Jonathan Jacobson describes its use:

Goebbels's description 

Joseph Goebbels also put forth a theory which has come to be commonly associated with the expression "big lie". Goebbels wrote the following paragraph in an article dated 12 January 1941, sixteen years after Hitler first used the phrase. The article, titled "Aus Churchills Lügenfabrik" (English: "From Churchill's Lie Factory") was published in Die Zeit ohne Beispiel.

Alleged quotation 
The following supposed quotation of Joseph Goebbels has been repeated in numerous books and articles and on thousands of web pages, yet none of them has cited a primary source. According to the research and reasoning of Randall Bytwerk, it is an unlikely thing for Goebbels to have said.

U.S. psychological profile of Hitler
The phrase "big lie" was used in a report prepared around 1943 by Walter C. Langer for the United States Office of Strategic Services in describing Hitler's psychological profile. The report was later published in book form as The Mind of Adolf Hitler in 1972. Langer stated of the dictator:

His primary rules were: never allow the public to cool off; never admit a fault or wrong; never concede that there may be some good in your enemy; never leave room for alternatives; never accept blame; concentrate on one enemy at a time and blame him for everything that goes wrong; people will believe a big lie sooner than a little one; and if you repeat it frequently enough people will sooner or later believe it.

A somewhat similar quote appears in the 1943 Analysis of the Personality of Adolph Hitler: With Predictions of His Future Behaviour and Suggestions for Dealing with Him Now and After Germany's Surrender, by Henry A. Murray:

... never to admit a fault or wrong; never to accept blame; concentrate on one enemy at a time; blame that enemy for everything that goes wrong; take advantage of every opportunity to raise a political whirlwind.

Subsequent use

Cold War era
Some U.S. Government officials believed that the technique continued to be employed by antisemitic conspiracy theorists in the decades after World War II. In their 1964 report on a fabricated antisemitic text first published in Russia in 1903, the members of the Senate Internal Security Subcommittee stated their belief that "peddlers" of the debunked pamphlet made use of "the Hitler technique of the 'big lie'" not only as a means of promoting antisemitic canards, but also to exploit American fears of Communist influence.

Donald Trump's false claims of a stolen election

During his political career, former President of the United States Donald Trump, has employed what has been characterized as the propaganda technique of a firehose of falsehood. To support his attempts to overturn the 2020 United States presidential election, he and his allies repeatedly and falsely claimed that there had been massive election fraud and that Trump was the true winner of the election. U.S. Senators Josh Hawley and Ted Cruz subsequently contested the election results in the Senate. Their effort was characterized as "the big lie" by then President-elect Joe Biden: "I think the American public has a real good, clear look at who they are. They're part of the big lie, the big lie." Republican senators Mitt Romney and Pat Toomey, scholars of fascism Timothy Snyder and Ruth Ben-Ghiat, Russian affairs expert Fiona Hill, and others also used the term "big lie" to refer to Trump's false claims about massive election fraud. By May 2021, many Republicans had come to embrace the false narrative and use it as justification to impose new voting restrictions and attempt to take control of the administrative management of elections. Republicans who opposed the narrative faced backlash.

Dominion Voting Systems, which provided voting machines to many jurisdictions in the 2020 United States elections, is seeking  in damages from Trump's lawyer Rudy Giuliani. In the lawsuit, Dominion alleges that "he and his allies manufactured and disseminated the 'Big Lie', which foreseeably went viral and deceived millions of people into believing that Dominion had stolen their votes and fixed the election."

In early 2021, The New York Times examined Trump's promotion of "the big lie" for political purposes to subvert the 2020 election, and concluded that the lie encouraged the 2021 attack on the U.S. Capitol. The attack was cited in a resolution to impeach Trump for a second time. During Trump's second impeachment trial, the house managers Jamie Raskin, Joe Neguse, Joaquin Castro, Stacey Plaskett and Madeleine Dean all used the phrase "the big lie" repeatedly to refer to the notion that the election was stolen, with a total of 16 mentions in the initial presentation alone. The phrase, leading up to and including the election period, formed the first section of the "provocation" part of the argument. On October 7, the Senate Judiciary Committee released new testimony and a staff report, according to which "we were only a half-step away from a full blown constitutional crisis as President Donald Trump and his loyalists threatened a wholesale takeover of the Department of Justice (DOJ). They also reveal how former Acting Civil Division Assistant Attorney General Jeffrey Clark became Trump's Big Lie Lawyer, pressuring his colleagues in DOJ to force an overturn of the 2020 election."

In early 2022, The New York Times presented a detailed analysis of the continuing efforts by Trump and his allies to further promote "the big lie" and related lies in their attempts to overturn and influence future elections, including those in 2022 and 2024. On June 13, 2022, the United States House Select Committee on the January 6 Attack presented testimony that Trump knew he lost the 2020 election, but nevertheless, promoted the false narrative to exploit donors, and, as a result, raked in "half a billion" dollars.

21st-century use by American conservatives 
The term has been used by prominent figures on the American Right to describe allegations that Trump's victory in the 2016 elections was the result of alleged collusion between his campaign and Russia. Former Attorney General William Barr described those allegations as "a very damaging, big lie" that inhibited the administration's ability to properly deal with Putin, a sentiment also echoed by Newt Gingrich.

By early 2021, Trump and several prominent Republicans tried to appropriate the term "the big lie", claiming that it refers to other electoral issues. Trump stated that the term refers to the "Fraudulent Presidential Election of 2020". An opinion piece in the typically conservative Wall Street Journal, as well as Republican politicians Mitch McConnell and Newt Gingrich, referred to "the big lie" as Democratic opposition to what were new and more restrictive voter identification requirements. McConnell's office referred to a Democratic attempt to abolish the filibuster to enact voting rights legislation as "the left's Big Lie [that] there is some evil anti-voting conspiracy sweeping America". Timothy Snyder observes:

The lie is so big that it reorders the world. And so part of telling the big lie is that you immediately say it's the other side that tells the big lie. Sadly, but it's just a matter of record, all of that is in Mein Kampf.

By January 2022, Republicans were taking actions to impose new voting restrictions and to take complete control of voting and the administrative management of elections, all while a large majority of Republicans continued to believe that the 2020 election had been stolen from them and asserted that democracy was at risk of failing. Extensive press coverage indicated the Republican efforts themselves appeared to present a threat to democracy.

Uyghur genocide 
The Government of China claims that the Uyghur genocide is a "big lie" perpetrated by hostile forces.

Russo-Ukrainian War 

Andrew Wilson of the European Council on Foreign Relations described the 2022 Russian invasion of Ukraine as "the War of the Big Lie. The Lie that Ukraine doesn't exist. The Lie that Ukraine has no right to full sovereignty because it is a puppet state of the West. The Lie that A invaded B because C is to blamethe West, the expansion of NATO, the USA's global hegemony."

Gender identity 

At a 2023 rally in Newcastle upon Tyne, a "gender critical" activist identified as Lisa Morgan quoted Hitler's words from Mein Kampf in a speech opposing trans rights, before saying that "The big lie is that trans women are women."

Analysis
Psychologists, psychiatrists and others have explained why the big lie technique works. Dr. Ramani Durvasula, a licensed clinical psychologist and professor of psychology who is an expert on narcissistic personality disorder and narcissistic abuse says that:

Repetition is important, because the Big Lie works through indoctrination. The Big Lie then becomes its own evidence baseif it is repeated enough, people believe it, and the very repetition almost tautologically becomes the support for the Lie. ... Hear something enough it becomes truth. People assume there is an evidence base when the lie is big (it's like a blind spot). ... [People also fail to realize] that there are people in our midst that lack empathy, have no care for the common good, are grandiose, arrogant, and willing to exploit and manipulate people for solely their own egocentric needs. ... [Instead] a sort of halo effect imbues leaders with presumed expertise and powerwhen that is not at all the case (most if not all megalomaniacal leaders, despots, tyrants, oligarchs share narcissism/psychopathy as a trait).

The importance of repetition in the acceptance of the big lie is stressed by Miriam Bowers-Abbott, an associate professor of logic at Mount Carmel College of Nursing, who states: "What's especially helpful is repetition in a variety of contexts. That is, not just the same words over and overbut integration of an idea in lots of ways. It builds its own little web of support." Such repetition can occur in the physical environment, according to Dr. Matt Blanchard, a clinical psychologist at New York University, who states: "Nothing sells the Big Lie like novelty t-shirts, hats and banners. These items are normally associated with sports teams, not life-and-death political issues. But Trump and his circle have deftly used these items to generate the kind of unbridled loyalty Americans associate with pro football. ... The banners and hats crucially add an air of silliness to everything. If I can buy a novelty hat about it, can it really be so serious? ... It's a genius mindf**k."

Blanchard also notes that people assess information that has a direct impact on their lives differently than more abstract information with less proximity to them. He states that "the act of 'believing' is not just one thing that humans do. Instead, this one word represents a wide range of relationships that humans have with information. We don't truly 'believe' things, so much as provisionally accept information we find useful." Because of this, he states that "most people don't whole-heartedly 'believe' the Big Lie, but they are more than happy to provisionally accept it because... why not? It might be entertaining. It might flatter your identity. It might help you bond with other people in your community. Or it might help you vent some rage. ... '[B]elief' is always predicated on usefulness."

Psychiatrist Bandy X. Lee notes that emotional reasons lie beneath the acceptance of outrageous assertions such as the big lie, stating:

Usually, they are trying to find comfort and to avoid pain. ... This happens in states of lesser health, where one is less inclined to venture into new domains or to seek creative solutions. There is comfort in repetition, and so a people or a nation under duress will gravitate more toward what is repeated to them than what is realistic. Adolf Hitler understood this very well, which is why the American psychologist Walter Langer coined the phrase to describe his method.

Social media also plays a role in such emotional responses, according to Bowers-Abbott, who states:It was easier to dislodge untruths before social media. In social media, people tend to take public positions. When that position turns out to be wrong, it's embarrassing. And backing down is typically seen as weakness. So they double-down on untrue claims to save face and personal credibility. ... We are way too emotionally attached to being right. It would be better for our culture as a whole to value uncertainty and intellectual humility and curiosity. Those values help us ask questions without the expectation of permanent answers.

Durvasula, Blanchard and Lee agree that it is unlikely that a believer in a big lie can be persuaded through the presentation of factual evidence. Durvasula argues that improvement in critical thinking skills is necessary, stating: "It means ending algorithms that only provide confirmatory news and instead people seeing stories and information that provide other points of view ... creating safe spaces to have these conversations ... encouraging civil discourse with those who hold different opinions, teaching people to find common ground (e.g. love of family) even when belief systems are not aligned." Blanchard says that "[S]preaders of the Big Lie will only be discredited in the eyes of their supporters if they face their greatest fearaccountability. ... They must be seen to lose at the ballot box, they must be arrested when they break the law, they must be sued for every defamation, they must be pursued with every legal tool available in an open society. ... Above all else they must be seen as weak. Only then will their lies lose their usefulness for the millions who once saw something to gainpersonally, psychologically, politically, financiallyin choosing to believe." Lee notes that it is important when attempting to disabuse someone of a big lie, it is important not to put them on the defensive: "You have to fix the underlying emotional vulnerability that led people to believing it in the first place. For populations, it is usually the pain of not having a place in the world, which socioeconomic inequality exacerbates. Deprivation of health care, education, an ability to make a living, and other avenues for dignity can make a population psychologically vulnerable to those who look to exploit them."

See also

 Demagogue
 Fake news
 Gaslighting
 Noble lie
 Post-truth politics
 Truthiness

References
Notes

Further reading

External links

 "Analysis of Nazi Propaganda" by Karthik Narayanaswami (Harvard University)
 "The Big Lie and Its Consequences" (Project Syndicate; 17 May 2021)
  (MSNBC News; July 29, 2022)

Deception
Lying
Propaganda techniques
Views on Adolf Hitler